The 1971–72 FAW Welsh Cup is the 85th season of the annual knockout tournament for competitive football teams in Wales.

Key
League name pointed after clubs name.
CCL – Cheshire County League
FL D2 – Football League Second Division
FL D3 – Football League Third Division
FL D4 – Football League Fourth Division
SFL – Southern Football League
WLN – Welsh League North
WLS – Welsh League South

Fifth round
Ten winners from the Fourth round and six new clubs.

Sixth round

Semifinal

Final

External links
The FAW Welsh Cup

1971-72
Wales
Cup